Woodland is a village in Chickasaw County, Mississippi, United States. The population was 125 at the 2010 census.

Geography

Demographics

As of the census of 2000, there were 159 people, 59 households, and 42 families residing in the village. The population density was 280.3 people per square mile (107.7/km). There were 60 housing units at an average density of 105.8 per square mile (40.6/km). The racial makeup of the village was 50.31% White, 44.65% African American, 4.40% from other races, and 0.63% from two or more races. Hispanic or Latino of any race were 9.43% of the population.

There were 59 households, out of which 44.1% had children under the age of 18 living with them, 47.5% were married couples living together, 20.3% had a female householder with no husband present, and 28.8% were non-families. 25.4% of all households were made up of individuals, and 8.5% had someone living alone who was 65 years of age or older. The average household size was 2.69 and the average family size was 3.19.

In the village, the population was spread out, with 33.3% under the age of 18, 10.1% from 18 to 24, 31.4% from 25 to 44, 13.8% from 45 to 64, and 11.3% who were 65 years of age or older. The median age was 30 years. For every 100 females, there were 101.3 males. For every 100 females age 18 and over, there were 103.8 males.

The median income for a household in the village was $21,000, and the median income for a family was $26,250. Males had a median income of $23,750 versus $16,250 for females. The per capita income for the village was $17,283. About 17.1% of families and 17.6% of the population were below the poverty line, including 11.5% of those under the age of eighteen and 15.8% of those 65 or over.

Mayor: Patti Watkins
Businesses: Woodland Wholesale & Retail Furniture, Woodland Outdoors, Springer's Mobile Homes, Faulkner's Quick Stop,

Events: Christmas Decorations
Woodland has one of the most sought after Christmas Decoration displays in the State of Mississippi. Each Season the Village is illuminated by over 1 million lights and countless displays of Christmas scenes. The project is organized by Mayor Patti Watkins and the City Board of Aldermen. The setup and construction of the decorations is a month-long undertaking and is done by many volunteers from the local area. The displays bring thousands of visitors to the small village, located in southern Chickasaw County, each year. 
The village also decorates for each season throughout the year. Whether it be hearts and cupids on Valentines or leprechauns and pots of gold on St Patrick's Day. Just to name a few of the yearly highlights. Most displays are created by village art director Linda Dendy.

Awards: Woodland won the Title of Best Small Town in MS from the State Municipal Association in 2012.

Education
The Village of Woodland is served by the Houston School District.

Notable person
 Bobbie Gentry, singer-songwriter

References

Villages in Chickasaw County, Mississippi
Villages in Mississippi